Ian Frederic Hay Davison  (1931–2022) was an accountant, chairman, executive and bell ringer.  He was the chief executive of Lloyd's of London from 1982 and helped to reform the insurer.

In 1988, he led a report on the management and operations of the Hong Kong Stock Exchange, following its closure during the Black Monday crash of 1987.  Defects were found and reforms recommended.

In 1998, the Institute of Chartered Accountants in England and Wales recognised him with the Founding Societies’ Centenary Award for his outstanding contributions.

He campaigned to reopen Templecombe railway station and became an enthusiastic bell ringer.

References

1931 births
2022 deaths
Accountants
Alumni of the London School of Economics
British accountants
People from Uxbridge
People educated at Dulwich College
University of Michigan alumni